X Factor is an Albanian television music competition to find new singing talents. The third season began on 15 September on TV Klan.

Based on the UK format, the competition consists of auditions, in front of producers and then the judges with a live audience; bootcamp; judges' houses and then the live finals. The producers' auditions for the show began in April 2013 in Albania, Kosovo and Macedonia. The winners were later called back to perform in front of the judges, held from May 19–21 in Tirana. However, the auditions were broadcast in September, when the show started airing. The show will be hosted once again by Albanian singer Alketa Vejsiu, while the judging panel consists of pop singer Altuna Sejdiu, Alban Skenderaj, Soni Malaj and Pandi Laço.

This year, the producers have decided to give more attention to the live shows, extending it to 15 weeks, and not airing bootcamp. The auditions were aired in three shows only, and then the show passed to the judges houses, airing only the finalists' bootcamp performance and result. Thus, to make the live shows longer to give the contestants more time to perform.

The other difference this year, is that there is a variety of contestants who come from different places. Sarah Memmola is from Italy, who challenged herself to take part in the X Factor Albania. There are six contestants from Macedonia this year. There is no soloist from Kosovo this year, and there is a singer from Serbia, Donika Nuhiu, for the first time in the show.

Judges' houses

The 15 eliminated acts were:
Boys: Endri Caci, Genti Sheholli, Ilirian Mertani, Yllnor Kurti
Girls: Alma Kadria, Anxhela Dano, Arlinda Kovaci, Oreta Leka
Over 23s: Adelina Bacaj, Ester Abazi, Joana Gjini
Groups: Divas, New Life, The Fevers, Victorious 4

Contestants
The top 16 contestants were confirmed as follows;

Key:
 – Winner
 – Runner-up
 – Third place

Live shows

Results summary 

Colour key

Live show details

Week 1 (27 October 2013)
 Group performance: "On the Floor"

Week 2 (3 November 2013)
 Group performance: "Counting Stars"

Judges' votes to eliminate
Pandi Laço: Ademir Fresku
Altuna Sejdiu: Dream Girls
Soni Malaj: Ademir Fresku
Alban Skënderaj: Ademir Fresku

Week 3 (10 November 2013)
Group performance: "You Are Not Alone"

Judges' votes to eliminate
Pandi Laço: Dream Girls
Soni Malaj: Laura Kërliu
Alban Skënderaj: Dream Girls
Altuna Sejdiu: Dream Girls

Week 4 (17 November 2013)

Judges' votes to eliminate
Pandi Laço: Arissa Rexho
Altuna Sejdiu: Kristina Leka
Soni Malaj: Arissa Rexho
Alban Skënderaj: Kristina Leka
With the acts in the bottom two receiving two votes each, the result was deadlocked and reverted to the earlier public vote. Leka was eliminated as the act with the fewest public votes.

Week 5 (24 November 2013)

Judges' votes to eliminate
Altuna Sejdiu: Nimfat 
Soni Malaj: Amadeo Gjura
Alban Skënderaj: Nimfat
Pandi Laço: Nimfat

Week 6 (8 December 2013)

Judges' votes to eliminate
Alban Skënderaj: Fatmir Durmishi 
Altuna Sejdiu: Fatmir Durmishi  
Soni Malaj: Fatmir Durmishi 
Pandi Laço: It was not necessary to vote for Fatmir Durmishi already had the votes necessary for elimination.

Week 7 (15 December 2013)

Judges' votes to eliminate
Soni Malaj: Arissa Rexho   
Pandi Laço: Exception
Alban Skënderaj: Exception 
Altuna Sejdiu: Arissa Rexho

With the acts in the bottom two receiving two votes each, the result was deadlocked and reverted to the earlier public vote. Rexho was eliminated as the act with the fewest public votes.

Week 8 (22 December 2013)

Judges' votes to eliminate
Altuna Sejdiu: Free Spirit
Soni Malaj: Amadeo Gjura 
Alban Skënderaj: Amadeo Gjura 
Pandi Laço: Free Spirit

Week 9 (5 January 2014)

Judges' votes to eliminate
Pandi Laço: Mia Morina
Alban Skënderaj: Laura Kërliu
Altuna Sejdiu: Mia Morina
Soni Malaj: Mia Morina

Week 10 (12 January 2014)

Judges' votes to eliminate
Altuna Sejdiu: Leotrim Zejnullahu
Alban Skënderaj: Amadeo Gjura
Soni Malaj: Amadeo Gjura 
Pandi Laço: Leotrim Zejnullahu

Week 11 (19 January 2014)

Judges' votes to eliminate
Pandi Laço: Exception
Soni Malaj: Laura Kërliu
Alban Skënderaj: Laura Kërliu
Altuna Sejdiu: Laura Kërliu

Week 12 (26 January 2014)

Judges' votes to eliminate
Alban Skënderaj: Leotrim Zejnullahu 
Altuna Sejdiu: Sarah Memmola 
Soni Malaj: Leotrim Zejnullahu
Pandi Laço: Leotrim Zejnullahu

Week 13 (2 February 2014)

Judges' votes to eliminate
Pandi Laço: Exception
Soni Malaj: Enxhi Nasufi
Alban Skenderaj: Exception
Altuna Sejdiu: Enxhi Nasufi

Week 14 (9 February 2014)

Week 15: Semi-Final (16 February 2014)

Judges' votes to eliminate
Pandi Laço: Sarah Memmola
Soni Malaj: Enxhi Nasufi
Alban Skenderaj: Enxhi Nasufi
Altuna Sejdiu: Enxhi Nasufi

References

X Factor (Albanian TV series)
2013 Albanian television seasons
2014 Albanian television seasons
Albania 03